Radu Almășan is a Romanian singer, most notable for his work in the band Bosquito, which he has led as the primary vocalist since its inception in 1999. He is also a founding member of the American alternative rock band Madame Hooligan.

Biography

Born in Brașov, Romania, Radu gained international notoriety with the success of Bosquito following the band's inception in 1999. After releasing four successful albums with the band, Radu moved to Los Angeles, formed his new band Madame Hooligan in 2007, and released their debut album in 2008. In 2010, Radu Almășan staged a comeback with Bosquito in his native Romania, releasing several successful singles with the new lineup and releasing Babylon, the band's fifth album to date.

Discography

As Bosquito:
 2000: Bosquito
 2002: Sar scântei
 2003: Cocktail Molotov
 2004: Fărâme din soare
 2014: Babylon
 2019: Sus

As Madame Hooligan:
 2008: "Antiheroes"

References
 http://www.romanialibera.ro/cultura/cultura-urbana/smiley-si-bosquito-concerteaza-in-deschiderea-concertului-shakira-223494
 https://web.archive.org/web/20141129040622/http://jurnalul.ro/cultura/muzica/radu-face-un-nou-bosquito-555832.html
 http://www.libertatea.ro/detalii/articol/bosquito-cand-ingerii-pleaca-365442.html

1980 births
Living people
Musicians from Bucharest
21st-century Romanian male singers
21st-century Romanian singers